Kate Gilmore may refer to:
 Kate Gilmore (UN official), Deputy High Commissioner for Human Rights of the United Nations
 Kate Gilmore (artist) (born 1975), fine artist 
 Kate Gilmore (actress), Irish stage and television actress